Kiwaia spinosa is a moth in the family Gelechiidae. It was described by Povolný in 1976. It is found in Nepal.

References

Kiwaia
Moths described in 1976